Dar Bou Hachem is a palace in the medina of Tunis.

Localization

This palace is situated in a dead end named "Bou Hachem", which is deriving from the street where it is located.

Bou Hachem family
The owners of this palace came to Tunis under the Hafsid dynasty's reign.

They lived in this house during the 19th and the early 20th century.

Architecture
The access to this palace is defended by a solid closed door. It is a narrow passage, covered at its beginning by a series of five vaults.

The doors of the makhzen lead to a covered walkway.

The raised patio is surrounded by richly decorated apartments decorated with earthenware, stucco and marble.

References 

Bou Hachem